"Get Hot or Go Home" is a song recorded by Canadian country music artist Rick Tippe. It was released in 1997 as the fourth single from his second studio album, Get Hot or Go Home. It peaked at number 10 on the RPM Country Tracks chart in February 1998.

Chart performance

References

1996 songs
1997 singles
Rick Tippe songs